The Mumford–Shah functional is a functional that is used to establish an optimality criterion for segmenting an image into sub-regions. An image is modeled as a piecewise-smooth function. The functional penalizes the distance between the model and the input image, the lack of smoothness of the model within the sub-regions, and the length of the boundaries of the sub-regions. By minimizing the functional one may compute the best image segmentation. The functional was proposed by mathematicians David Mumford and Jayant Shah in 1989.

Definition of the Mumford–Shah functional 
Consider an image I with a domain of definition D, call J the image's model, and call B the boundaries that are associated with the model: the Mumford–Shah functional E[ J,B ] is defined as

Optimization of the functional may be achieved by approximating it with another functional, as proposed by Ambrosio and Tortorelli.

Minimization of the functional

Ambrosio–Tortorelli limit 
Ambrosio and Tortorelli showed that Mumford–Shah functional E[ J,B ] can be obtained as the limit of a family of energy functionals E[ J,z,ε ] where the boundary B is replaced by continuous function z whose magnitude indicates the presence of a boundary. Their analysis show that the Mumford–Shah functional has a well-defined minimum. It also yields an algorithm for estimating the minimum.

The functionals they define have the following form:

where ε > 0 is a (small) parameter and ϕ(z) is a potential function. Two typical choices for ϕ(z) are

 This choice associates the edge set B with the set of points z such that ϕ1(z) ≈ 0
 This choice associates the edge set B with the set of points z such that ϕ2(z) ≈ 1/4

The energy functional E[ J,z,ε ] can be minimized by gradient descent methods, assuring the convergence to a local minimum.

Ambrosio, Fusco, and Hutchinson, established a result to give an optimal estimate of the Hausdorff dimension of the singular set of minimizers of the Mumford-Shah energy.

Minimization by splitting into one-dimensional problems 

The Mumford-Shah functional can be splitted it into coupled one-dimensional subproblems.
The subproblems are solved exactly by dynamic programming.

See also
Bounded variation
Caccioppoli set
Digital image processing
Luigi Ambrosio

Notes

References

Image segmentation